incr Tcl (commonly stylised as [incr Tcl], and often abbreviated to itcl) is a set of object-oriented extensions for the Tcl programming language.  It is widely used among the Tcl community, and is generally regarded as industrial strength .  Its name is a pun on "C++".  Itcl implementations exist as both a package that may be dynamically loaded by a Tcl application, as well as an independent standalone language with its own interpreter.

Overview

Features

Namespace support 
Itcl allows namespaces to be used for organizing commands and variables.

Example:
package require Itcl
    
itcl::class Toaster {
    variable crumbs 0
    method toast {nslices} {
        if {$crumbs > 50} {
            error "== FIRE! FIRE! =="
        }
        set crumbs [expr $crumbs+4*$nslices]
    }
    method clean {} {
        set crumbs 0
    }
}
    
itcl::class SmartToaster {
    inherit Toaster
    method toast {nslices} {
        if {$crumbs > 40} {
            clean
        }
        return [chain $nslices]
    }
}
    
set toaster [SmartToaster #auto]
$toaster toast 2

C code integration 
Itcl (like Tcl) has built-in support for the integration of C code into Itcl classes.

Licensing 
Itcl follows the same copyright restrictions as Tcl/Tk. You can use, copy, modify and even redistribute this software without any written agreement or royalty, provided that you keep all copyright notices intact. You cannot claim ownership of the software; the authors and their institutions retain ownership, as described in the "license.terms" files included in the standard distribution.  For more information please see incrtcl.sourceforge.net/itcl/copyright.html.

See also
OTcl
XOTcl
Tcllib
Itk
Tk (framework)

References
incr Tcl from the Ground Up by Chad Smith, published in January 2000.
This is a complete reference manual for incr Tcl, covering language fundamentals, OO design issues, overloading, code reuse, multiple inheritance, abstract base classes, and performance issues. Despite its breadth, it follows a tutorial, rather than encyclopedic, approach.  This book is out of print as of September 2004.

External links
Itcl/incr Tcl project page
Tcl package site
tclweb project (there is a mailing list maintained at this site)

Scripting languages
Dynamically typed programming languages
Tcl programming language family
1993 software